Kay Kirsten Evert Smits (born 31 March 1997) is a Dutch handball player for SC Magdeburg and the Dutch national team.

He represented the Netherlands at the 2020 European Men's Handball Championship.

His father , sister Inger and brother Jorn are also international handball players.

Honours 
Handball-Bundesliga:
: 2022
EHF European League:
: 2022
IHF Super Globe:
: 2021, 2022
Dutch Championship:
: 2015, 2016
Dutch Handball Cup:
: 2015, 2016
BENE-League:
: 2015

References

External links

1997 births
Living people
Dutch male handball players
People from Geleen
Expatriate handball players
Limburg Lions players
TTH Holstebro players
Dutch expatriate sportspeople in Denmark
Dutch expatriate sportspeople in Germany
Handball-Bundesliga players
SC Magdeburg players
Sportspeople from Limburg (Netherlands)
SG Flensburg-Handewitt players